Barchfeld-Immelborn is a municipality in the Wartburgkreis district of Thuringia, Germany. It was formed on 31 December 2012 by the merger of the former municipalities Barchfeld and Immelborn. The river Werra flows through the municipality.

References

Wartburgkreis